The Fourteenth Assembly of Pondicherry succeeded the 13th Assembly of Pondicherry and was constituted after the victory of Indian National Congress (INC) and allies in the 2016 assembly election held on 16 May 2016.

Important members
 Speaker:
V. Vaithilingam from 10 June 2016 to 21 March 2019
V.P. Sivakolundhu from 3 June 2019 to 22 February 2021
 Deputy Speaker:
 V.P. Sivakolundhu from 10 Jun 2016 to 2. Jun. 2019
 M.N.R. Balan from 4 September 2019 to 22 February 2021
 Chief minister:
 V. Narayanasamy from 6 June 2016 to 22 February 2021
 Leader of opposition:
 N. Rangaswamy from June 2016 to 22 February 2021
Keys:

See also 
Government of Puducherry
List of Chief Ministers of Puducherry
 List of speakers of the Puducherry Legislative Assembly
List of lieutenant governors of Puducherry
Puducherry Legislative Assembly
Pondicherry Representative Assembly
2016 Puducherry Legislative Assembly election
First Assembly of Puducherry

References

Notes

Puducherry Legislative Assembly
Puducherry
2016 establishments in Puducherry